Fun with Dick and Jane is a 1977 American black comedy film starring George Segal and Jane Fonda. Directed by Ted Kotcheff, the film is caustically critical of the "anarchy" of the American way of life.

The character names come from the Dick and Jane series of children's educational books, and the title is taken from the title of one of the books in the series.

Plot

Dick Harper is a successful aerospace engineer in Los Angeles, where he and wife Jane have a lovely house, with a swimming pool and new lawn under way. Jane takes care of their son, Billy.

Because of financial reversals at the business, however, Dick's boss, Charlie Blanchard, suddenly fires him. Dick and Jane owe more than $70,000 and abruptly find themselves with no income. Their attempts to find other gainful employment fail. Jane lands a fashion modeling appearance at a restaurant that becomes a fiasco. Dick ends up applying for unemployment and food stamps, while Jane's wealthy parents, rather than helping, advise them to use this experience positively as a life lesson.

Unable to come up with any other solution to their problems, Dick and Jane turn to a life of crime. They make an effort to select their victims judiciously – robbing the telephone company, for example, so making the customers in line cheer. In time, Dick and Jane weigh their guilty consciences against their needs, trying to get back their old lives and stay out of jail.  They make the decision to "retire" from robbery.  However, almost immediately they see Charlie Blanchard on television, testifying in front of a Congressional committee.  After realizing that Charlie keeps two hundred thousand dollars in his office as a slush fund (used to pay off lawmakers), Dick and Jane decide to rob Charlie.  At a gala at Dick's old firm, Dick and Jane break into Charlie's office, crack the safe, and steal the money.  They leave his office and make it to the main floor of the building, but the building's security guards alert Charlie before the couple can leave.  They are seen guarding all the exits.  Dick admits to Charlie that he and Jane have stolen his money.  However, they also explain that Jane has called the police about the theft.  Knowing that the $200,000 might be confiscated by the authorities and lead to further unwanted investigations, Charlie tells the arriving police that no crime was committed and walks the couple safely out of the building.

A press release announces that Dick has been hired to be president of the firm, as Charlie has resigned.

Cast
 George Segal as Dick Harper
 Jane Fonda as Jane Harper
 Ed McMahon as Charlie Blanchard
 Dick Gautier as Dr. Will
 Allan Miller as Loan company manager
 Hank Garcia as Raoul Esteban
 John Dehner as Jane's father
 Mary Jackson as Jane's mother
 Walter Brooke as Mr. Weeks
 Sean Frye as Billy
 Fred Willard as Bob
 John Brandon as Pete Winston
 Thayer David as Deacon
 Burke Byrnes as Roger
 Dewayne Jesse as Robber
 Anne Ramsey as Employment applicant
 Jon Christian Erickson as Transsexual
 Gloria Stroock as Mildred Blanchard
 Art Evans as Man at Bar
 Richard Foronjy as Landscape Man
 Harry Holcombe as Pharmacist
 James Jeter as Immigration Officer
 Thalmus Rasulala as Food Stamp Man
 James Reynolds (uncredited) as Johnson, Income Maintenance Technician
 Jay Leno (uncredited) as Carpenter

Reception
The film was Columbia's third highest-grossing film in the US in 1977 with rentals returned from the United States and Canada of $13.6 million.

The film received mixed reviews from critics. On Rotten Tomatoes the film has a 50% rating based on reviews from 14 critics.

Roger Ebert of the Chicago Sun-Times gave it 2.5 out of 4, and wrote: "This stuff is funny enough, but somehow it's too easy. It's situation comedy, when the movie's earlier moments seemed to be promising us a hard-boiled commentary..."

Remake
The film was remade in 2005 with the same title, starring Jim Carrey and Téa Leoni.

References

Bibliography

External links
 
 

1977 films
1970s crime comedy films
American satirical films
American crime comedy films
American heist films
Films directed by Ted Kotcheff
Mordecai Richler
Termination of employment in popular culture
Films scored by Ernest Gold
Films with screenplays by Jerry Belson
1970s heist films
Columbia Pictures films
1977 comedy films
1970s English-language films
1970s American films